Kumbungu is one of the constituencies represented in the Parliament of Ghana. It elects one member of parliament (MP) by the first past the post system of election. It is located in the Northern Region of Ghana. The current member of Parliament for the constituency is Dr Hamzah Adam. He won the 2020 election

Members of Parliament

Elections

See also
Satani
List of Ghana Parliament constituencies
List of political parties in Ghana

References 

Parliamentary constituencies in the Northern Region (Ghana)